HLA-B58 (B58) is an HLA-B serotype. B58 is a split antigen from the B17 broad antigen, the sister serotype B57. The serotype identifies the more common HLA-B*58 gene products. (For terminology help see: HLA-serotype tutorial) B*5801 is associated with allopurinol induced inflammatory necrotic skin disease.

Serotype

Allele distribution

Disease
HLA-B*5801 is involved in allopurinol sensitive drug induced Stevens–Johnson syndrome.  Allopurinol is a frequent cause of severe cutaneous adverse reactions, including drug-hypersensitivity syndrome, Stevens–Johnson syndrome, and toxic epidermal necrolysis (SJS/TEN). The association with allopurinol sensitivity in SJS/TEN was extremely strong in Asia, and somewhat less associated in Europeans.

References

5
Drug-sensitivity genes